Stephenoscolex is a genus of polychaete worm known from the Middle Cambrian Burgess Shale. 150 specimens of Stephenoscolex are known from the Greater Phyllopod bed, where they comprise 0.29% of the community. The genus was described by Conway Morris (1979) and re-examined by Eibye-Jacobsen (2004).

References

External links 
 

Burgess Shale fossils
Prehistoric annelid genera
Polychaetes

Cambrian genus extinctions